The Noguchi table is a piece of modernist furniture first produced in the mid-20th century. Introduced by Herman Miller in 1947, it was designed in the United States by Japanese American artist and industrial designer Isamu Noguchi. The Noguchi table comprises a wooden base composed of two identical curved wood pieces, and a heavy plate glass top.

History
The Noguchi table was an evolution of a rosewood and glass table Noguchi designed in 1939 for A. Conger Goodyear, president of the Museum of Modern Art. The design team at Herman Miller was so impressed by the table's use of biomorphism that they recruited Noguchi to design a similar table with a freeform sculptural base and biomorphic glass top for use in both residential and office environments. 

The 1947 Herman Miller catalog described the Noguchi coffee table as "sculpture-for-use" and "design for production". The base was carved from solid walnut, and consisted of two identical parts; when one part "is reversed and connected to the other by a pivot rod, a base appears which has a smoothly flowing form and an interest rarely found in furniture of any period". The shape of the two wooden supports produces a self-supporting and stable base, allowing the heavy plate glass top to be placed without the use of connectors.

Construction
The base was originally produced in walnut, birch, and cherry. It was later offered in ebonized walnut. Cherry bases were made only during the first year the table was on the market, and have been highly sought since. Birch bases were discontinued after 1954. As of 2016, the table is available in an ebonized finish, walnut, white ash and natural cherry.

The top was originally issued in  heavy plate glass.

Since the late 1980s, indexing pins have been installed on the pivot rod with matching slots milled into the legs to ensure that the two leg elements are set up at a 52-degree angle for maximum aesthetic appeal and optimal stability.

Production
The Noguchi table became one of Herman Miller's most iconic and successful designs. Production ceased in 1973, and the piece became an instant collectible. Herman Miller reissued it in 1980 in a limited edition of about 480 tables. The table was reintroduced again in 1984 for the "Herman Miller Classics" line, and has been in production ever since.

Examples
Despite their status as modern classics, Noguchi tables are widely available and relatively affordable. This is at least partly because they were in constant production from 1947 until 1973, returned to production in 1984, and have been produced ever since. In addition, the table is very durable, and few have been lost over the years. The base can be dinged and scratched, but almost never cracks or breaks. The glass tops are prone to chipping along the edges and scratching on the upper surface, but are so large and heavy they rarely break. The table can support a great weight without damage. Earlier tables are easily distinguished by their ⅞-inch thick tops, but do not command much premium over the current lighter and easier-to-handle ¾″ models. Buyers can expect to pay $500 and up for an undamaged example, and $1,500 and up for an early version in birch . Only the 1947 cherry tables are truly rare collectibles, which rarely show up for sale except at high-end auctions.
 Two Noguchi tables, one in natural birch and one in ebonized birch, are in the collection of the Museum of Modern Art in New York City. 
 A Noguchi table in ebonized birch is on display at The Henry Ford Museum in Dearborn, Michigan.

Further reading

References

External links
The Herman Miller Consortium Collection at Wayne State University Library is a historic, digital, product collection originally accumulated as part of Herman Miller's corporate archives in a digitized, searchable format and includes images of Noguchi tables on display at various art museums.

1947 introductions
Tables (furniture)
History of furniture
Modernist works
Individual models of furniture